Abraham Jones (April 1899 – after 1923) was an English professional footballer who played as a forward in the Football League for Birmingham, Reading, Brighton & Hove Albion and Merthyr Town in the early 1920s. He was also on the books of Stoke.

Jones was born in West Bromwich, Staffordshire, the son of West Bromwich Albion and Middlesbrough footballer Abraham Jones. He played local football for West Bromwich Sandwell before joining Birmingham in 1919. He made his debut in the Second Division deputising for Harry Hampton in a home game against Fulham on 6 April 1920, scoring both goals in a 2–0 win. Though Jones retained his place for the next two games, Hampton kept him out of the side thereafter, and in August 1921 he moved on to Reading. A season later he joined Brighton & Hove Albion, after another year went to Merthyr Town, and then to Stoke.

References

1899 births
Year of death missing
Sportspeople from West Bromwich
English footballers
Association football forwards
Birmingham City F.C. players
Reading F.C. players
Brighton & Hove Albion F.C. players
Merthyr Town F.C. players
Stoke City F.C. players
English Football League players
Place of death missing